A liability insurance company's duty to settle is defined as an implied obligation to by the insurer to a policyholder and to a claimant to attempt "in good faith to effectuate prompt, fair, and equitable settlements of claims in which liability has become reasonably clear." To the surprise of many, a typical liability insurance policy makes no express contractual promise to settle. In California, "an insurer, who wrongfully refuses to accept a reasonable settlement within the policy limits is liable for the entire judgment against the insured even if it exceeds the policy limits." A rationale for this duty is that "[w]hen an offer is made to settle a claim in excess of policy limits for an amount within policy limits, a genuine and immediate conflict of interest arises between carrier and assured." "An insurer who denies coverage does so at its own risk. Such factors as a belief that the policy does not provide coverage, should not affect a decision as to whether the settlement offer in question is a reasonable one." "It is the duty of the insurer to keep the insured informed of settlement offers." "[A]n insurer potentially can be liable for unreasonably coercing an insured to contribute to a settlement fund."

An insurer may not "discriminate in its claims settlement practices based upon" certain protected classes.

References

American legal terminology
Insurance law
Insurance law legal terminology